Hathorhotep was an ancient Egyptian king's daughter at the end of the Twelfth Dynasty during the Middle Kingdom.

Attestation
Hathorhotep ("Hathor is satisfied") is only known from the fragment of a canopic vase found in pyramid of king Amenemhat III (who ruled about 1860 BCE to c.1814 BCE) at Dahshur. She was most likely buried in the pyramid and might be a daughter of Amenemhat III. However, the inscription on the fragment shows incomplete hieroglyphs. That means that animals are shown without legs, to avoid these animals could attack the deceased. This type of writing was only used from the reign of Amenemhat III, in the Twelfth Dynasty, onward into the Thirteenth Dynasty. Therefore, it is also possible that Hathorhotep was the daughter of another, later king.

References 

Princesses of the Twelfth Dynasty of Egypt
19th-century BC Egyptian women
Children of Amenemhat III